= Shingle Hollow =

Valley in New York, United States

Coordinates: 42.8447°N 73.3570°W

Shingle Hollow is a valley in the U.S. state of New York.

Shingle Hollow took its name from a shingle mill.
